The British Sociological Association (BSA) is a scholarly and professional society for sociologists in the United Kingdom, and was founded in 1951. It publishes the academic journals Sociology, Work, Employment and Society, Sociological Research Online and Cultural Sociology (with SAGE Publications) as well as its membership newsletter Network and a monthly eNewsletter. Formerly, the British Journal of Sociology was the BSA's official journal, but it was replaced by Sociology some years after the latter had been established.

It is a registered charitable company (charity no: 1080235) which states its mission is to "represent the intellectual and sociological interests of our members."

Organisation
The activities of the BSA are co-ordinated by an Advisory Forum charged with overseeing governance, membership services and publications. Decisions are monitored and ratified by the Board of Trustees, which includes the BSA president.

An office of 12 staff members takes care of the day-to-day running of the Association.

Presidents
Gurminder K. Bhambra 2022-
Susan Halford, 2018–2021 
Lynn Jamieson, 2014–2018
John Holmwood, 2012–2014
John Brewer, 2009–2012
Sue Scott, 2007–2009
Geoff Payne, 2005–2007
Joan Busfield, 2003–2005
John Scott, 2001–2003
Sara Arber, 1999–2001
David Morgan, 1997–1999
Stuart Hall, 1995–1997
Michèle Barrett, 1993–1995
John Westergaard, 1991–1993
Sir Robert Burgess, 1989–1991
Jennifer Platt, 1987–1989
Martin Albrow, 1985–1987
Richard Brown, 1983–1985
Margaret Stacey, 1981–1983
John Eldridge, 1979–1981
Keith Kelsall, 1977–1979
Sheila Allen, 1975–1977
Peter Worsley, 1971–1975
Tom Bottomore, 1969–1971
T. H. Marshall, 1964–1969
Barbara Wootton, Baroness Wootton of Abinger, 1959–1964
Morris Ginsberg, 1955–1957

Publications

Academic journals
The BSA publishes Sociology, Work, Employment and Society,Cultural Sociology, and Sociological Research Online.

Network newsletter
The association publishes a newsletter, Network, for its members three times a year, Spring, Summer and Autumn.

Awards

Philip Abrams Memorial Prize
The Philip Abrams Memorial Prize has been awarded almost every year since 1989 for "the best first and sole-authored book within the discipline of Sociology". Past winners include Barbara Adam (1991, for Time and Social Theory), Graeme Kirkpatrick (2005 for Critical Technology: A Social Theory of Personal Computing) and Maddie Breeze (2016, for Seriousness and Women's Roller Derby: Gender, Organization and Ambivalence). The prize is named for professor Philip Abrams (1933–1981).

References

External links
British Sociological Association web site
 Catalogue of the papers of the British Sociological Association at the Archives Division of the London School of Economics
Catalogue of the BSA Medical Sociology Group archives, held at the Modern Records Centre, University of Warwick

 
1951 establishments in the United Kingdom
Academic organisations based in the United Kingdom
Learned societies of the United Kingdom
Organisations based in County Durham
Organizations established in 1951
Sociological organizations